Prince Dasho Khamsum Singye Wangchuck (born 6 October 1985) is a prince of Bhutan. He is the son of the fourth King of Bhutan Jigme Singye Wangchuck and his wife, Queen Mother Ashi Sangay Choden Wangchuck. He is half-brother of the fifth King, Jigme Khesar Namgyel Wangchuck.

Education 
He was educated at Lungtenzampa Middle Secondary School, Yangchenphug Higher Secondary School and Royal Military Academy Sandhurst.

Military career 
He was commissioned in the Royal Bhutan Army as 2nd-Lieutenant (16 December 2005).

Titles and styles

 6 October 1985 – present: His Royal Highness Prince Dasho Khamsum Singye Wangchuck.

See also
 House of Wangchuck
 Line of succession to the Bhutanese throne

References

|-

Bhutanese monarchy
Living people
1985 births
Wangchuck dynasty
Graduates of the Royal Military Academy Sandhurst
Sons of kings